The Leader of Alderney is the civil leader of Alderney. Alderney is a dependency of the Bailiwick of Guernsey. Its leader has traditionally been appointed by the British Crown and has been known by various titles including Lord of Alderney, Governor of Alderney, and the current President of the States of Alderney. The President of the States of Alderney is directly elected every four years and there is no constitutional limit to the number of terms served. The current president, William Tate has held the post since 2019.

Current function
The Leader of Alderney is the highest civil figure in Alderney. The President as leader currently is elected by all of Alderney for a four-year term. The President is also the chairman of the States of Alderney and entitled to vote; however, this is usually only done in the event of a tied vote, where he has the deciding vote.

Historical role
Alderney was initially part of the Duchy of Normandy from 933 AD. In 1042, possession of Alderney passed to Mont Saint Michel Abbey and from there, passed to the Bishop of Coutances. In 1182, the first individual leader of Alderney was William L'Ingenieur who was ennobled as Lord of Alderney. During L'Ingenieur's time as Lord of Alderney, possession was granted to him as a fief. As a result of this, Alderney was invaded and occupied by the French twice in 1204 and 1205 before being reclaimed by England each time. Under his successor as Lord of Alderney, Peter L'Ingenieur, ownership of Alderney was divided between the King of England (as the Duke of Normandy) and the Bishop of Coutances. In 1228, the title of the Lord of Alderney became extinct as Peter L'Ingenieur had no lawfully begotten male heirs. During this time France invaded Alderney again before being expelled by English forces, with King Henry III of England stripping the Bishop of the rights to Alderney and taking sole ownership as a result of the French actions. Under the Treaty of Brétigny in 1260, the Bishop's rights in Alderney were restored.

In 1559, George Chamberlain was appointed as the Lieutenant-Governor of Alderney and later bought the title and lease of Alderney from the Crown. In 1586 Queen Elizabeth I of England ordered the Bishop of Coutances surrender the rights to Alderney to the Bishop of Winchester, which was done shortly after the leadership of Alderney had passed to Robert Devereux, 2nd Earl of Essex despite the Earl of Essex never visiting Alderney. During the English Civil War and the Commonwealth of England, leadership of Alderney changed hands several times between the Royalists and Parliamentarians with Nicholas Ling being appointed as the Lieutenant-Governor of Alderney by Oliver Cromwell. In 1660, during the Restoration of the Monarchy, Edward de Carteret was granted the title of Governor of Alderney by King Charles II of England as a reward for loyalty to the Crown and became the leader of Alderney as a result, with Ling remaining as Lieutenant-Governor. Alderney was also separated from Guernsey as a result of the creation of the governorship. The governorship went into abeyance after the death of his son, Edward de Carteret before being sold to Sir Edmund Andros by de Carteret's widow. Andros then was granted the governorship on a 99-year lease from the Crown in exchange for an annual 13 shillings payment of rent to the Crown. The Governor of Alderney became a hereditary position and later passed to the Le Mesurier family through marriage with the Andros family. The lease was later extended by King George III of Great Britain. In 1825 the governor, John Le Mesurier III resigned the grant of the island and returned it to the Crown in exchange for an annual pension of £700 (approximately £). This agreement eventually expired in 1862.

After the office of Governor of Alderney was abolished, the Judge of Alderney assumed the role of leader of Alderney as the highest ranking appointed representative of the Crown on the island. The Judge of Alderney was the leader of Alderney as well as the head of Alderney's judiciary. This lasted up until the Second World War when Alderney and the rest of the Channel Islands were occupied by Nazi Germany and the leadership of Alderney was assumed by German officials. Most of Alderney's population had been evacuated and the Nazis used Alderney as a base to build the Atlantic Wall and the Alderney camps. Thus during the war, the concentration camp commandants and administrators took over as leaders of Alderney.

When the Channel Islands were liberated, the Judge of Alderney regained leadership of Alderney. However, by 1947 less than 50% of Alderney's population had returned to the island. This led to the Parliament of the United Kingdom discussing what to do with Alderney as land ownership markers and official papers had been destroyed in the war and Alderney's economy was stagnating as a result of more than half of the islanders not returning. The United Kingdom's Home Secretary, Chuter Ede recommended "Guernseyfication" of Alderney. In 1948 His Majesty's Privy Council decided that Alderney would become a part of the Bailiwick of Guernsey again. Later in the year, both the States of Alderney and the States of Guernsey voted through the Alderney (Application of Legislation) Law which gave powers to the States of Guernsey in respect of certain "transferred services" in 1949. The law also provided for a democratically elected President of the States of Alderney to be the Leader of Alderney as the Judge of Alderney had been superseded as the representative of the Crown on Alderney by the Lieutenant Governor of Guernsey.

List of Leaders of Alderney

See also 
 President of the States of Alderney

References

Books

External links
 Leaders of Alderney

Politics of Alderney
History of Alderney